Re Duke of Norfolk’s Settlement Trusts [1982] Ch 61 is an English trusts law case, which confirmed that a court has the inherent jurisdiction to remunerate a trustee.

Facts
The Schroder Executor & Trustee Co Ltd had a fee scale set under their trust instrument to administer the Duke of Norfolk's settlement trust (after the death of the 16th Duke, Bernard Fitzalan-Howard, 16th Duke of Norfolk). The trustees claimed an extra £25,000 in fees for exceptional and unforeseen work involved in a central London property redevelopment scheme, and similar work surrounding the Capital Transfer Tax 1975 introduction and also to revise the fee scale for the future.

At first instance, Walton J granted the first claim, but not the second two.

Judgment
Fox LJ, overturning Walton J, confirmed that the court had the inherent jurisdiction, not only to authorise payment of trustees where none had been made by the settlor, but also to increase it. He said,

Brightman LJ and Cumming-Bruce LJ concurred.

See also
Boardman v Phipps [1966] UKHL 2
Broughton v Broughton (1855) 5 De GM&G 160, 164, Lord Cranworth LC
Turner v Hancock (1882) 20 ChD 303, 305, per Sir George Jessel MR
Re Worthington [1954] 1 WLR 526, the power to pay money should be exercised sparingly, given it is money not going to the beneficiaries
Foster v Spencer [1996] 2 All ER 672, the question of whether a trustee should get money for work already done framed in terms of whether the beneficiaries had been ‘unjustly enriched’ if they would not pay. Trustees do not normally get interest on incurred, 678, ‘ordinary costs and expenses accrued in a piecemeal fashion’.
Malcolm v O'Callaghan (1835) 3 Myl & Cr 52, trustee claimed for several trips to Paris to attend court hearings, since they were not concerned with the trust as it related to English law.
Robinson v Pett (1734) 3 P Wms 249, 251, Lord Talbot LC said the reason for the default no allowance position ‘seems to be… if allowed, the trust estate might be loaded, and rendered of little value. Besides, the great difficulty there might be in settling the quantum of such allowance, especially as one man’s time may be more valuable than that of another; and there can be no hardship in this respect upon any trustee, who may choose whether he will accept the trust, or not.’
Guinness plc v Saunders [1990] 2 AC 663, Lord Goff held a Boardman v Phipps type quantum meruit can be made only ‘where it cannot have the effect of encouraging trustees in any way to put themselves in a position where their interests conflict with their duties as trustees.’

Notes

References

English trusts case law
Court of Appeal (England and Wales) cases
1981 in British law
1981 in case law
Dukes of Norfolk